This is a list of official U.S. state, federal district, and territory amphibians.   State amphibians are designated by tradition or the respective state legislatures.

As of 2021, only 27 states and one territory have a state amphibian.

Table

See also
Lists of U.S. state insignia

References

External links

State
Amphibians
Amphibians in culture